William Widenlocher (9 November 1912 - 20 August 1991) was a French politician.

Widenlocher was born in Bordj Bou Arréridj, Algeria.  He represented the French Section of the Workers' International (SFIO) in the National Assembly from 1958 to 1962.

References

1912 births
1991 deaths
People from Bordj Bou Arréridj
People of French Algeria
Pieds-Noirs
French Section of the Workers' International politicians
Deputies of the 1st National Assembly of the French Fifth Republic
Free French military personnel of World War II
Migrants from French Algeria to France